Andrew Jamieson Strathern (born 19 January 1939) is a British anthropologist.

Strathern earned a doctorate at the University of Cambridge, and teaches at the University of Pittsburgh, where he serves as Andrew Mellon Professor of Anthropology. He is married to Pamela J. Stewart, a fellow anthropologist employed at Pitt. A collection of their joint work is held at the University of Pittsburgh, as the Pamela J. Stewart and Andrew J. Strathern Archive, and at the University of California, San Diego, as the Strathern (Andrew) and Pamela J. Stewart Photographs and Audiorecordings. Andrew Strathern is a fellow of the Association for Social Anthropology in Oceania. He was previously married to Marilyn Strathern.

Selected publications

References

External Links 

 Andrew Strathern and Pamela J. Stewart Recordings From the Andrew Strathern and Pamela J. Stewart Photographs and Audiorecordings. MSS 477. Special Collections & Archives, UC San Diego.

1939 births
Living people
British anthropologists
Alumni of the University of Cambridge
University of Pittsburgh faculty
British expatriates in the United States
21st-century anthropologists
20th-century anthropologists